Jagdfliegerführer 4 was formed April 1, 1943 in Rennes subordinated to the Luftflotte 3. On September 6, 1943 the unit redesignated Jagdfliegerführer Bretagne and reformed again on September 6, 1943 in Saint-Pol-Brias from Jagdfliegerführer 2, subordinated to 4. Jagd-Division. The headquarters was located at Rennes and from 6 September 1943 in Saint-Pol-Brias. The unit was disbanded on August 31, 1944

Commanding officers

Fliegerführer
Oberstleutnant Walter Oesau, 1 July 1943 - 6 September 1943
Oberst Josef Priller, 6 September 1943 - 1 April 1944
Oberst Hilmer von Bülow-Bothkamp, 1 April 1944 - 31 August 1944

References
Notes

References

Luftwaffe Fliegerführer
Military units and formations established in 1943
Military units and formations disestablished in 1944